Ketnet is a Dutch-language public children's television channel in Belgium owned and operated by the VRT, Flemish public broadcaster. It broadcasts a mix of locally produced and imported productions on the VRT3 channel from 6am until 8pm.

On 1 December 1997, BRTN 2 was replaced by Canvas and Ketnet.

On 1 May 2012, Ketnet has been moved on a new channel, timesharing with Op 12. Op 12 closed on 31 December 2014.

The preschool programmes are broadcast on Ketnet Junior between 10am to 7pm on Canvas.

Its French-language counterpart is Ouftivi on La Trois.

Presenters
As with VRT's main television station één, Ketnet employs in-vision continuity announcers. In the case of Ketnet, the announcers also present various programmes for the station and are known as Ketnetwrappers.

Logos

Programming

Belgian

AbraKOdabra
Amika
Back to School met Zita
Bol & Smik, the Flemish version of Big & Small
Boris en Binti
Campus 12
D5R
Daar is Dobus
Dag Sinterklaas (every year November and early December)
De elfenheuvel
Galaxy Park
Go Go Stop
Go IV
Ghostrockers
Hopla
Ketnetpop
Kwiskwat, the Flemish version of Kerwhizz
LikeMe
Mega Mindy
Musti
NT van Ketnet - Presented by Peter and Heidi, the show is broadcast in Belgium and the Netherlands.
Piet Piraat
ROX
Samson en Gert
Sintressante Dingen (every year November and December)
Spring
Stafari
Tip en Tap
Van-a-1, Van-a-2 (formerly aired from BRTN TV2 until 1 December 1997 on Monday)
W817

International

6teen
Aladdin
Alfred J. Kwak
Angry Birds Toons
The Backyardigans
Buzz Lightyear of Star Command
Code Lyoko
Degrassi: The Next Generation
The Emperor's New School
Famous 5: On the Case
Fish Hooks
FloopaLoo, Where Are You?
Gaspard and Lisa
George of the Jungle
Goof Troop
Goosebumps
Hercules
Hey Arnold!
Hubert and Takako
Jacob Two-Two
The Jungle Book
Kim Possible
Larva
Little Einsteins
The Little Prince
Mama Mirabelle's Home Movies
Max & Ruby
Mickey Mouse Clubhouse
Miss BG
My Friends Tigger & Pooh
My Parents Are Aliens
Oggy and the Cockroaches
Pokémon
Phineas and Ferb
Pinkalicious & Peterrific
Ready or Not
Round the Twist
The Adventures of the Bush Patrol
The Sarah Jane Adventures
Scooter: Secret Agent
The Secret World of Alex Mack
Shaun the Sheep
SheZow
Skippy the Bush Kangaroo
The Smurfs
Spirou et Fantasio
Strawberry Shortcake
The Three Friends and Jerry
Tweenies
Vic the Viking
Wallace and Gromit
Wild Kratts
Zoé Kézako

Shorts
Crime Time
Pat & Stan

KetnetRadio

On 17 November 2007, Ketnet launched KetnetRadio, an online radio station consisting of a looped 3-hour programme, broadcast for 24 hours. A new programme is produced and broadcast every day. KetnetRadio is presented by Ketnet presenter and continuity announcer Kristien Maes. Listeners can tune in on Ketnet's website.

See also
 BRTN TV2

References

External links
 

1997 establishments in Belgium
Children's television networks
Television channels in Flanders
Television channels in Belgium
Television channels and stations established in 1997